Wilson Stuart Stone (October 6, 1907 – February 28, 1968) was an American geneticist and zoologist. Stone received his bachelor, Masters and PhD at the University of Texas and joined the department of zoology in 1932. Stone mentors were J. T. Patterson, H.J. Muller, and Theophilus Painter.  Stone's work was primarily in radiation genetics, drosophila speciation, and population genetics. In 1946 along with Wyss and Hass demonstrated the indirect of effects of ultraviolet radiation causing mutations in bacteria.

Helped found the genetics foundation at University of Texas in 1952
Chairman of the department of zoology at University of Texas (1959–1963)
Was vice-Chancellor of the university system
Consultant for Atomic Energy Commission
Elected to National Academy of Sciences (1960)
Co-editor of Genetics (1957–1963)
Associate editor of Radiation Research (1960–1963)
Secretary of American Society of Naturalists (1947–1949)

In Memoriam awards
Wilson S. Stone Memorial Award was created in 1971 to recognize young researchers who have made outstanding contributions to biomedical sciences in the United States and presented at the annual Symposium on Fundamental Cancer Research sponsored by The University of Texas M. D. Anderson Cancer Center.

References
National Academy of Sciences. Biographical memoirs. 
"Wilson Stuart Stone" by James F. Crow pages in 451-468  Washington, D.C.: National Academy Press.  
https://books.google.com/books?id=h9xnzIV_zQYC&printsec=frontcover#PPA451,M2

Radiation Research 42(2) 430-432 (1970)

1907 births
Members of the United States National Academy of Sciences
1968 deaths
American geneticists
21st-century American politicians
People from Junction, Texas
Genetics (journal) editors